Isabelle Schmutz (born 12 February 1971) is a Swiss judoka. She competed at the 1996 Summer Olympics and the 2000 Summer Olympics.

References

1971 births
Living people
Swiss female judoka
Olympic judoka of Switzerland
Judoka at the 1996 Summer Olympics
Judoka at the 2000 Summer Olympics
Place of birth missing (living people)